Smita Gondkar is an Indian actress who works primarily in Marathi and Hindi films. She also featured in the Marathi music video "Pappi De Parula". She was a contestant on Bigg Boss Marathi 1.

Career
Smita Gondkar has worked in the United States with Disney Cruise Line alongside people from 55 nations. She was the only female semi-finalist on the show MTV Stuntmania in 2009. She started her career with Marathi films like Mumbaicha Dabewala, Satya-More Than Human, Hip Hip Hurrah and Bayko No.1.

Filmography

Films

Television

References

External links
 
 

Actresses from Mumbai
Indian film actresses
Marathi actors
Actresses in Marathi cinema
Actresses in Hindi cinema
21st-century Indian actresses
Living people
1978 births
Bigg Boss Marathi contestants